Suzuka Mambo (April 28, 2001 –  February 20, 2015) was a Thoroughbred racehorse and grade I stakes winner. He was sired by Sunday Silence, and out of the Kingmambo daughter Spring Mambo.

Background
Suzuka Mambo was foaled on April 28, 2001, at Japan's Grand Stud. He was sired by 1989 Kentucky Derby winner Sunday Silence, and out of Spring Mambo, a daughter of Kingmambo; he was a dark bay stallion with a white blaze, white stockings on his right front and left rear legs, and a partial coronet marking on his left foreleg.

Racing career

2003: 2 year old season
Suzuka Mambo debuted in Sapporo on August 17, 2003, finishing fourth, but he won his next race on August 31. He ran ninth in his next attempt, the G III Sapporo Nisai Stakes, but then won the Hagi Stakes at Kyoto Racecourse on November 1. His last race of his two-year season was the GI Asahi Hai Futurity Stakes where he finished 13th in a field of 16 horses.

2004: 3 year old season
In 2004, Suzuka Mambo ran eight races with widely varying outcomes. His first race of the year was the Keisei Cup in January, where he finished 4th. He then ran second at the Wakaba Stakes in March, with a time of 2:00.2. But in April he took a step back, finishing 17th of 18 horses in the Satsuki Sho, also known as the "Japanese 2000 Guineas." Suzuka Mambo was not yet eligible for the Tokyo Yushin (Japanese Derby) due to insufficient winning prize money, so his connections chose the G II Kyoto Shimbun HA for his next run, where he finished second and thus was able to get into the derby. In Tokyo for the May 30 race, he was not popular, ranking 15th, but finished a respectable fifth out of 18 horses. After a break of three months, Suzuka Mambo's next race was the G III Asahi Challenge Cup at Hanshin Racecourse on September 11, 2004, where he was the favorite and won his only race of the year. However, in his next effort, the Kikuka Sho (or "Japanese St. Leger") on October 24, he finished sixth. Suzuka Mambo went on to close out his year with the G III Naruo Kinen. Although he was the favorite, he finished second.

2005 and 2006: 4 and 5 year old season
In 2005 as a mature 4 year old, Suzuka Mambo ran five times, four of them Grade I races, again with widely varying results. However, in that race, he got a good trip on the course and won. He did not race again until the autumn Tenno Sho on October 30, where he finished last of 18 horses. He tried again in the GI Japan Cup on November 27, where he finished 9th of 18 horses. His next attempt was the December 25 Arima Kinen (The Grand Prix) wh/ere he finished 10th out of 16. In 2006, Suzuka Mambo, at 5 years old, began the season on April 2 at the G II Sankei Osaka Hai (Osaka Cup). In this race, he finished third. It seemed that his career was back on an upswing, but after the race Suzuka Mambo developed a serious ligament tear in his left hind leg that ended his racing career.

Stud career
Suzuka Mambo was retired to the Arrow Stud in Hokkaido, where he began his stud career at age seven. Between 2008 and 2014, he sired a total of 400 foals, of whom 305 started in at least one race, and 202 were winners.  These included Grade I winners Meisho Mambo, winner of the 2013 Yushun Himba and Sambista (JPN), winner of the 2015 Champions Cup.

Suzuka Mambo remained at Arrow Stud until his death from heart failure on February 20, 2015.  He was buried at Sakuramaiba park.

Pedigree

References 

Racehorses bred in Japan
Racehorses trained in Japan
Thoroughbred family 7
2001 racehorse births
2015 racehorse deaths